The Bayer designation c Scorpii is shared by two star systems in the constellation Scorpius:
 c1 Scorpii (12 Scorpii)
 c2 Scorpii (13 Scorpii)

References

Scorpii, c
Scorpius (constellation)